The Catholic Order of Foresters are fraternal benefit societies in the United States.

Massachusetts Foresters 
On 30 July 1879, some members of the St. Vincent de Paul Society of Boston, Massachusetts, most of them Irish immigrants, desiring to have a Catholic fraternal insurance society, organized one on the plan of the "courts" of the Independent Order of Foresters and called it the Massachusetts Catholic Order of Foresters. Originally membership was confined to the Commonwealth of Massachusetts, except in one instance, where a court was formed at Providence, Rhode Island. On 1 January 1909, the official report stated that there were 235 courts organized, with a membership of 27,757. Of the members 9679 were women. The insurance in force on 31 Dec., 1908, was $27,757,000.

On August 11, 1958 the Agreement of Association, Articles of Incorporation, Constitution and Bylaws of the Society were amended to change the name of the organization to Catholic Association of Foresters. It is headquartered in Braintree, Massachusetts.

Illinois Foresters 
On 24 May 1883, a number of Catholics of Chicago, Illinois, taking up the plan of this Massachusetts society, organized on the same lines the Catholic Order of Foresters of Illinois. A flat all-around death assessment of one dollar was adopted, and men of all ages were admitted to membership at the same rate. Later, when courts were established in a number of other States and in Canada, an international convention in 1895 adopted a graded system of assessment insurance. Catholics between eighteen and forty-five years of age were eligible for membership. The word Illinois in the original title of the organization was dropped in 1888, as the membership had then extended beyond the limits of that State.

From the date of organization to 1 June 1908, it paid out $10,639,936 for death claims, and $2,500,000 in funeral and sick benefits. It had in April, 1909, 1600 courts and a membership of 136,212 distributed over twenty-six States and the Dominion of Canada. The main offices were at Chicago, Illinois. The official organ, The Catholic Forester, was published at Milwaukee, Wisconsin. This society was not affiliated with the Massachusetts Catholic Order of Foresters.

It is headquartered in Naperville, Illinois.

Women's Catholic Order of Foresters 
A Women's Catholic Order of Foresters was organized in 1891 at Chicago, having for its object benevolent co-operation among Catholic women with assessment life-insurance at low rates.  Women at that time were not allowed to vote or incorporate, so their articles of incorporation were signed by men. By 1909 it had a membership of 54,350, with courts scattered over many of the States. The main offices were at Chicago.

Membership was extended to men and boys in 1958, and at their Diamond Jubilee Convention in 1966, the Women's Catholic Order of Foresters became the National Catholic Society of Foresters (NCSF). In 2021 NCSF rebranded to 1891 Financial Life; reflecting the year of their formation and their fundamental purpose as an organization, continuing their commitment to membership to help financially protect families while enabling members to help their community. 1891 Financial Life continues to Look Out for their membership and partnerships. Their motto has not changed: Love Benevolence and Charity. It is presently headquartered in Mt. Prospect, Illinois.

References

External links 
Catholic Order of Foresters website
Catholic Association of Foresters website
1891 Financial Life
Massachusetts Catholic Order of Foresters (MCOF) records, 1879-1988, University Archives and Special Collections, Joseph P. Healey Library, University of Massachusetts Boston

Catholic fraternal orders
Catholic organizations established in the 19th century